Renée Dunan (1892–1936), was a French writer, critic and poet.

Selected works 

 La triple caresse, 1922
 La Culotte en jersey de soie, 1923
 Une Heure de désir
 La Flèche d'Amour
 Le Stylet en langue de carpe
 Magdeleine
 Mimi Joconde ou la belle sans chemise
 L'Amant trop aimé, (M. de Steinthal)
 Le Prix Lacombyne, 1924
 Baal ou la magicienne passionnée, livre des ensorcellements, 1924
 Le Brigand hongre, 1924
 Kaschmir, Jardin du bonheur, 1925
 La Dernière Jouissance, 1925
 Les Nuits voluptueuses, 1926
 Entre deux caresses, 1927
 Je l'ai échapé belle !, 1927
 Le Sexe et le poignard : la vie ardente de Jules César, 1928
 La confession cynique, 1928
 Éros et Psyché, 1928
 Cantharide, roman de moeurs parisiennes, 1928 (Louis Querelle)
 Les Caprices du sexe ou les Audaces érotiques de Mademoiselle Louise de B…, 1928, (Louis Dormienne)
 L'Extraordinaire aventure de la Papesse Jeanne, 1929
 Le Masque de fer ou l'amour prisonnier, 1929
 Les jeux libertins, 1930
 La Chair au soleil, 1930
 Le Meurtre du milliardaire, 1934
 Moi, poupée, (Spaddy)
 Dévergondages, (Spaddy)
 Colette ou les Amusements de bon ton, 1936, (Jean Spaddy)

References

External links 
 Le Métal, une nouvelle de Renée Dunan, illustrée.

French anarchists
French feminists
Dada
1892 births
1936 deaths
French women novelists
Anarcha-feminists
Pseudonymous women writers
20th-century French novelists
Social nudity advocates
20th-century French women
20th-century pseudonymous writers